The 2014–15 San Francisco Dons women's basketball team will represent the University of San Francisco in the 2014–15 college basketball season. It was head coach Jennifer Azzi's fifth season at San Francisco. The Dons, members of the West Coast Conference, play their home games at War Memorial Gymnasium. They finished the season 19–14, 8–10 in WCC play to finish in sixth place. They advanced to the championship of the WCC women's tournament where they lost to BYU. They were invited to the Women's National Invitation Tournament where they lost in the first round to Fresno State.

Roster

Schedule and results

|-
!colspan=12 style="background:#FFCC33; color:#006633;"| Exhibition Season

|-
!colspan=9 style="background:#006633; color:#FFCC33;"| Regular Season

|-
!colspan=9 style="background:#006633; color:#FFCC33;"| 2015 WCC Tournament

|-
!colspan=9 style="background:#006633; color:#FFCC33;"| WNIT

Rankings

See also
San Francisco Dons women's basketball

References

San Francisco Dons women's basketball seasons
San Francisco
San Francisco Dons
San Francisco Dons